The Battle of Dahlenkirchen took place on 22 August 1812, between French and allied troops, with a victory of the Russian army of about 6,000 against the French about 1,500 strong.

Battle

On 22 August 1812 a Russian attack took place on the right wing of the Prussians at Dahlenkirchen and Olai, and at the same time on the left wing at Schlock and St.Annen. On the right wing, Colonel Horn was completely surprised, and after some resistance he had to retreat. Ultimately, the Prussians were able to stop the attacks, but they gave up Dahlenkirchen because they could not defend it.

Aftermath
The unsuccessful siege of Riga went on.

See also
List of battles of the French invasion of Russia

Notes

References

External sources

In popular culture
http://www.kurpfalz-feldherren.de/artikel/gefecht-bei-dahlenkirchen-napoleonisch-black-powder-spiel-vom-26032016-teil-1

External links
 

Battles of the French invasion of Russia
Battles of the Napoleonic Wars
Battles involving France
Battles involving Russia
Conflicts in 1812
1812 in France
August 1812 events